Neli Zafirova (born December 22, 1976) is a Bulgarian sprint canoer who competed in the mid-1990s. At the 1996 Summer Olympics in Atlanta, she was eliminated in the semifinals of the K-2 500 m event.

References

Sports-Reference.com profile

1976 births
Bulgarian female canoeists
Canoeists at the 1996 Summer Olympics
Living people
Olympic canoeists of Bulgaria